Andrew Ramsay may refer to:

 Andrew Ramsay (minister) (1574–1659), Scottish minister, Rector of the University of Edinburgh
 Andrew Ramsay, Lord Abbotshall (1619–1688), Scottish judge, Lord Provost of Edinburgh (son of the above)
 Sir Andrew Ramsay, 1st Baronet, Scottish politician
 Andrew Michael Ramsay (1686–1743), Scottish-born writer in France
 Andrew Ramsay (governor), governor of Bombay, 1788 
 Andrew Ramsay (geologist) (1814–1891), Scottish geologist
 Andrew Maitland Ramsay (1859–1946), Scottish ophthalmologist
 Andy Ramsay (born 1964), British drummer, programmer and sound engineer
 Several of the Ramsay baronets

See also
 Andrew Ramsay Don-Wauchope (1861–1948), Scottish international rugby union forward
 Andrew Ramsey (disambiguation)